Pirolate (CP-32,387) is an antihistamine drug with a tricyclic chemical structure which was patented as an "antiallergen". It was never marketed and there are very few references to it in the literature.

References 

H1 receptor antagonists
Nitrogen heterocycles
Lactams
Phenol ethers
Carboxylate esters
Heterocyclic compounds with 3 rings